Sandra Sigurðardóttir (born 2 October 1986) is an Icelandic former football goalkeeper. Sandra has played for Iceland's national team and was a squad member at the 2009 and 2013 editions of the UEFA Women's Championship. During her career, she won six Icelandic championships and four Icelandic Cups. She retired in 2023 as the Besta deild kvenna's all-time leader in games played.

Club career
In 2011 Sandra signed for Swedish Damallsvenskan team Jitex BK. A contract dispute followed and Sandra quickly left, but she was not allowed to play for Stjarnan again until FIFA ruled in her favour. In 2016, Sandra signed for Valur. In June 2017, she became the Úrvalsdeild kvenna all-time leader in matches played, after breaking Sigurlín Jónsdóttir's 18-year-old record of 233 matches. In May 2021, she broke the 300 match barrier.

In March 2023, she announced her retirement from football.

International career
Sandra made her senior Iceland debut in a 3–0 defeat by the United States in July 2005. She was seen as the national team's third choice goalkeeper behind Þóra Björg Helgadóttir and Guðbjörg Gunnarsdóttir and collected five more caps during the next five years.

National team coach Siggi Eyjólfsson selected Sandra in the Iceland squad for UEFA Women's Euro 2013 in Sweden.

Private life 
Sandra is married to Icelandic sport manager Hafdís Inga Hinriksdóttir. They have two children together.

References

External links

1986 births
Living people
Sandra Sigurdardottir
Sandra Sigurdardottir
Sandra Sigurdardottir
Jitex BK players
Women's association football goalkeepers
Sandra Sigurdardottir
Damallsvenskan players
UEFA Women's Euro 2022 players
Icelandic LGBT sportspeople
LGBT association football players
Lesbian sportswomen
21st-century LGBT people
UEFA Women's Euro 2017 players